Super Bodyguard, also known as The Bodyguard Chao ji bao biao, is a 2016 Chinese action drama film directed by Yue Song and also starring Yue Song. It was released in China on July 15, 2016.

Plot
Wu-Lin chooses the dark path to seek for revenge, and take the law in his own hands. Wu-Lin is not just a regular man from the rural village, he is also the Successor of an ancient, once powerful Chinese clan, the "Iron Feet". After the death of the clan master, Wu-Lin left the village and come to the City of Stone-cold to look for his fellow apprentice Jiang Li. He turn out become the bodyguard of Fei-Fei, the daughter of Jia-Shan Li, the richest family in the city. A clash of an unruly rich girl with a rugged and masculine bodyguard, sparks the flame of true love. Wu-Lin soon discovered that a group of mobster led by Jiang Li, attempts to kidnap Fei-Fei. To protect his love one, Wu-Lin forced to fight them alone. Brutally crushed, but Wu-Lin managed to survive, he took off his iron-shoes, and feel the adrenaline rush into his body again. Wu-Lin decided to face the group of mobsters once more, and he knows someone much bigger, stronger than Jiang Li is behind the evil plot.

Cast
Yue Song
ihsan
Li Yufei
Collin Chou
Michael Chan
Shang Tielong
Xu Dongmei
Yang Jun
Li Changhai
Jiang Baocheng
Yuan Wu
Dong Jiangtao

Reception
The film grossed  at the Chinese box office.

References

External links

2016 films
2016 action drama films
Chinese action drama films
Films about bodyguards
Triad films
2010s Hong Kong films